Saint-Aimé-des-Lacs is a municipality in the Capitale-Nationale region of Quebec, Canada.

Demographics

Population

Private dwellings occupied by usual residents: 454 (total dwellings: 736)

Language
Mother tongue:
 English as first language: 0.9%
 French as first language: 99.1%
 English and French as first language: 0%
 Other as first language: 0%

See also
Rivière du Gouffre
List of municipalities in Quebec

References

Incorporated places in Capitale-Nationale
Municipalities in Quebec